Castillo (Spanish for "castle") may refer to:

People
 Castillo (surname)

Places

Geography

Dominican Republic 
 Castillo, Dominican Republic, a town in Duarte Province, Dominican Republic

Nicaragua 
 El Castillo (municipality), a municipality in the Río San Juan department
 El Castillo (village), a village in the Río San Juan department
 Montealegre del Castillo, a municipality in Albacete, Castile-La Mancha

Spain 
 Castillo, Álava, a village in the Basque Country
 Castillo-Albaráñez, a municipality in Cuenca, Castile-La Mancha
 Castillo de Garcimuñoz, a municipality in Cuenca, Castile-La Mancha
 Castillo-Nuevo, a town in Navarre

Man-made structures
 Castillo de Chapultepec, palace on Chapultepec Hill, located in the middle of Chapultepec Park in Mexico City
 Castillo de Guzman, castle in Tarifa, Spain
 Castillo de Jagua, fortress near Cienfuegos Bay, Cuba
 Castillo de San Marcos, old Spanish fort in St. Augustine, Florida, USA
 El Castillo, Chichen Itza, Mayan step-pyramid in Chichen Itza Yucatán, Mexico

Arts, entertainment, and media
 El Castillo de los Monstruos (disambiguation), multiple films
 El Castillo Interior, 1577 novel by Saint Teresa of Avila], multiple films

Other uses
 Cad. FAP Guillermo del Castillo Paredes Airport, airport serving Tarapoto, Peru
 Castillo v. Texas, 2000 Texas court case regarding the sale of pornography
 Castillo CF, football team from Gran Canaria, Canary Islands

See also
 Del Castillo (disambiguation)
 Castilho (disambiguation)